The 4th International Emmy Kids Awards ceremony, presented by the International Academy of Television Arts and Sciences (IATAS), took place on April 5, 2016 in Cannes, France. The nominations were announced on October 2, 2015.

Ceremony information
Nominations for the 4th International Emmy Kids Awards were announced on October 2, 2015 by the International Academy of Television Arts and Sciences (IATAS) during a press conference at MIPCOM in Cannes, France. The winners were announced on April 5, 2016 at the Carlton Hotel, in Cannes during MIPTV. The winners spanned series from Australia, Japan, Norway, The Netherlands and the United Kingdom.

Winners

References

External links 
 International Academy of Television Arts and Sciences website

International Emmy Kids Awards ceremonies
International Emmy Kids Awards
International Emmy Kids Awards
International Emmy Kids Awards
International Emmy Kids Awards